Mark A. Baird is a retired United States Air Force brigadier general who last served as the deputy director of the Space Force Planning Task Force. Previously he was the Deputy Director of the National Reconnaissance Office.

After working briefly at Lockheed Martin as a "Principal Director of Strategy for Space and Special Programs," he went on to be the president of VOX Space, a subsidiary of Virgin Orbit, on 17 August 2021.

References

External links
 

Year of birth missing (living people)
Living people
Place of birth missing (living people)
United States Air Force generals